Myristica lowiana is a species of plant in the family Myristicaceae. It is a tree found in Sumatra, Singapore, Peninsular Malaysia and Borneo.

References

lowiana
Trees of Sumatra
Trees of Malaya
Trees of Borneo
Near threatened flora of Asia
Taxonomy articles created by Polbot